The 2022–23 Eastern Illinois Panthers men's basketball team represented Eastern Illinois University in the 2022–23 NCAA Division I men's basketball season. The Panthers, led by second-year head coach Marty Simmons, played their home games at Lantz Arena in Charleston, Illinois, as members of the Ohio Valley Conference. They finished the season 9–22, 5–13 in OVC play to finish in last place. They failed to qualify for the OVC Tournament.

On December 21, 2022, the Panthers defeated Iowa marking the team's fourth win in program history of a Power Five school.

Previous season
The Panthers finished the 2021–22 season 5–26, 3–15 in OVC play to finish in last place. They failed to qualify for the OVC tournament.

Roster

Schedule and results

|-
!colspan=12 style=""| Non-conference regular season

|-
!colspan=12 style=""| OVC regular season

Sources

References

Eastern Illinois Panthers men's basketball seasons
Eastern Illinois Panthers
Eastern Illinois Panthers men's basketball
Eastern Illinois Panthers men's basketball